Robert C. Campbell (1885 – July 1966) was a Captain in the British Army in WWI. Captured as a prisoner of war by Imperial Germany in 1914, he was held in captivity for two years before appealing to the Kaiser for a visit to his dying mother. His request was granted and after a two-week visit he voluntarily returned to the POW camp, where he remained until the end of the war.

Military career
The British Expeditionary Force (BEF) was engaging the Imperial German Army during the Battle of Mons. During this engagement 14,000 British soldiers were killed, wounded or missing. One of those made POW was Campbell. On 24 August 1914, while commanding the 1 Battalion of East Surrey Regiment Campbell was taken prisoner. The war diary of the 1st Battalion recorded that on 23 August 1914 that it was a misty and wet day. During fighting on the 24 August five officers and 134 soldiers were lost including Campbell.

He spent two years in captivity, at a POW camp in Magdeburg, north-east Germany, when he got word from his sister that his mother, Louisa, was dying. He wrote the German Kaiser pleading that he be allowed to visit his dying mother. His petition was successful and arrangements were made through the embassy of the United States of America, which was neutral at the time. Campbell was made to swear that he return to the POW camp after seeing his mother. Richard van Emden, writing in his 2013 book Meeting the Enemy, speculated that Campbell would have felt it honourable to return and "he would have thought 'if I don't go back no other officer will ever be released on this basis'". He crossed into neutral Holland from Germany and took a ferry to the UK before returning after some time by the same route.

After he returned to the POW camp, with other prisoners, he spent nine months digging their way out of the camp and making a break for the Dutch border. Unfortunately, his group was captured on the Dutch border and sent back into captivity. After the war, Capt Campbell returned to Britain and served in the military until 1925.

Death

While living on the Isle of Wight in July 1966 he died, aged 81.

Bibliography 
Notes

References 

 - Total pages: 400
 - Total pages: 224

1885 births
1966 deaths
British Army personnel of World War I
East Surrey Regiment officers
British World War I prisoners of war
World War I prisoners of war held by Germany
Military personnel from Kent
People from Gravesend, Kent